The 2015–16 season was Lille OSC's 72nd season in existence and the club's 16th consecutive season in the top flight of French football.

Players

Current squad
As of 2 February 2016.

Out on loan

Appearances and goals

Last updated: 14 May 2016
Source: Match reports in Competitive matches, Ligue1.com

Goalscorers

Last updated: 14 May 2016
Source: Match reports in Competitive matches

Disciplinary record

Transfers

Transfers in

Loans in

Transfers out

Loans out

Pre-season and friendlies

Competitions

Ligue 1

League table

Results summary

Results by round

Matches

Coupe de France

Coupe de la Ligue

References

Lille OSC seasons
Lille OSC